A bill is a class of agricultural implement used for trimming tree limbs, which was often repurposed for use as an infantry polearm. In English, the term 'Italian bill' is applied to the similar roncone or roncola, but the Italian version tended to have a long thrusting spike in addition to the cutting blade. 

The English distinguished among several varieties of bill, including the black, brown and forest bills, but the differences between them are currently not fully understood. Bills were adapted to military use through addition of various projecting blades. Other variants include the bill hook and bill-guisarme.

Disambiguation
The bill is similar in size, function and appearance to the halberd, and might be said to represent convergent evolution to fill a common niche: a pole-arm with a point to thrust with, a hook to drag with, and a spike/axe to cut with. The bill should not be conflated with a war-scythe, another pole-arm adapted from an agricultural implement, the scythe. 

Bills have been found in Frankish graves from the Merovingian period.

During the early 16th century when most European states were adopting the pike and arquebus, the English preferred to stick with the combination of bill and English longbow. Even in the Tudor period, bills were still common with levies sent to fight the Scots. The Battle of Flodden in 1513 was a classic match between continental-style pike formations (Scots) and billmen (English). When the English army fought in the Italian War of 1542–1546, the bill was still the main polearm of the English.

The English increasingly transitioned to pike and shot formations from the mid 16th century, but kept the billhook in use in the same capacity as other armies used greatswords and halberds. In 1588, the English Trained Bands consisted of 36% arquebusiers, 6% musketeers, 16% bowmen, 26% pikemen, and 16% billmen. Lansdowne MS 56, attributed to Lord Burghley, states that ideally infantry formations should consist of 50% shot, 30% pikes, and 20% bills. 

Along with the pike, the bill is mentioned as being one of the main weapons of the Irish rebels in Ulster during the 1798 rebellion.

Although obsolete as a military weapon by the 17th century, bills were sent (along with other obsolete arms and armour) to the New World with English colonists to provide defence against Native Americans and Spanish military expeditions. Examples of bills have been excavated at the site of Jamestown, Virginia.

Variants 

The shorthanded bills were used by the army of historic India as well, mainly by infantrymen of Bengal. 

An agricultural version, commonly known as either a brush-axe, bush-axe, or brush-hook, is readily available in rural hardware and farm-supply stores in the United States today, and is available in the United Kingdom as a "long bill". It has a  handle, and a  head. It is  useful for clearing undergrowth and unwanted hedgerows. Both the concave and convex edges may be sharpened edges, but spear-points and back-hooks are not available. Expertly used, the brush-axe can fell a  tree with a single blow.

In Brazil the bill (foice) is a very common tool in rural areas as tool and sometimes as a self-defence weapon.

See also
Billhook
Falx
Siege hook

Footnotes

References 

 

Medieval polearms
Medieval blade weapons